The 2004–05 Liechtenstein Cup was the sixteenth season of Liechtenstein's annual cup competition. Seven clubs competed with a total of sixteen teams for one spot in the first qualifying round of the UEFA Cup. Defending champions were FC Vaduz, who have won the cup continuously since 1998.

Qualifying round

|colspan="3" style="background-color:#99CCCC; text-align:center;"|24 August 2004

|}

First round

|colspan="3" style="background-color:#99CCCC; text-align:center;"|28 September 2004

|-
|colspan="3" style="background-color:#99CCCC; text-align:center;"|29 September 2004

|}

Quarterfinals

|colspan="3" style="background-color:#99CCCC; text-align:center;"|20 October 2004

|-
|colspan="3" style="background-color:#99CCCC; text-align:center;"|26 October 2004

|}

Semifinals

|colspan="3" style="background-color:#99CCCC; text-align:center;"|9 November 2004

|-
|colspan="3" style="background-color:#99CCCC; text-align:center;"|10 November 2004

|}

Final

External links
Official site of the LFV
RSSSF

Liechtenstein Football Cup seasons
Cup
Liechtenstein Cup